Francis James Kelly (23 December 1910 – 6 July 1982) was an Australian rules footballer who played for Collingwood, Melbourne, Essendon and St Kilda in the Victorian Football League (VFL).

Family
The son of Michael Joseph Kelly (1892-1953), and Eleanor Mary Kelly (1892-1977), née Caroll, Francis James Kelly was born at Northcote, Victoria on 23 December 1910.

He married Thelma Veronica Mitchener (1909-2012) in 1934.

Football

Collingwood (VFL)
Used on the wing or as a centreman, Kelly played his junior football with Collingwood and was promoted to their seniors in 1930. Despite playing the Preliminary Final, Kelly was omitted from the Collingwood team which won the 1930 VFL Grand Final.

Beechworth (O&KFL)
Cleared from Collingwood in May 1932, he spent the 1932 season at the Beechworth Football Club in the Ovens & King Football League as captain-coach.

Collingwood (VFL)
He returned to Collingwood in 1933.

Melbourne (VFL)
Kelly crossed to Melbourne in 1934, and played with them for three seasons.

Essendon (VFL)
Cleared from Melbourne to Essendon in 1937, he played with them for three seasons (1938-1939).

In 1938 he was reported on three occasions:
 7 May 1938. In the match against Carlton, at Windy Hill on 7 May 1938 Carlton's ruckman Harry Hollingshead was reported for striking Kelly, and Kelly was reported for retaliating. The tribunal found both players guilty; and, making allowances for their previous clean records, Hollingshead was suspended for five weeks, and Kelly for three weeks
 30 July 1938. In the match against Carlton, at Princes Park on 30 July 1938 Kelly was reported for kicking Carlton's Charlie McInnes. At the hearing on 2 August 1938, "because the evidence against Kelly was not conclusive, the tribunal decided to give him the benefit of the doubt, and dismissed the case".
 6 August 1938. In the match against North Melbourne, at Windy Hill on 6 August 1938 North Melbourne's half-back flanker Roy Sitch was reported for striking Kelly, and Kelly was reported for retaliating. The tribunal found both players guilty, and they were each suspended for four matches.

Port Melbourne (VFA)   
Cleared from Essendon in April 1940, he captain-coached Port Melbourne in the Victorian Football Association (VFA) for two years—which included the 1940 VFA premiership.

St Kilda (VFL)
In 1942 he returned to the VFL and joined his fourth club, St Kilda, for whom he kicked 21 goals that year and would captain in the 1944 season.

Port Melbourne (VFA)   
In 1945 he returned to Port Melbourne, playing for two more seasons (1945-1946).

Yallourn North
Kelly later played at Yallourn North as captain-coach.

Moe
In 1954 he was coach of the Moe Football Club.

Military service
He enlisted in the Second AIF in January 1942, served overseas in New Guinea, and was demobilized in October 1945.

Death
He died at Moe, Victoria on 6 July 1982.

Footnotes

References
 Holmesby, Russell and Main, Jim (2007). The Encyclopedia of AFL Footballers. 7th ed. Melbourne: Bas Publishing.
 Maplestone, M., Flying Higher: History of the Essendon Football Club 1872–1996, Essendon Football Club, (Melbourne), 1996. 
 World War Two Nominal Roll: Sapper Francis James John Kelly (VX127395), Department of Veterans' Affairs.
 World War Two Service Record: Sapper Francis James John Kelly (VX127395), National Archives of Australia.
 Charity Match at South Melbourne, The Sporting Globe, (Saturday, 23 July 1949), p. 9.

External links

 
 
 Frank Kelly, at The VFA Project.
 Frank Kelly, at Demonwiki.
 Frank Kelly, at Collingwood Forever.
 Frank Kelly, at Boyles Football Photos.

1910 births
Australian rules footballers from Melbourne
Collingwood Football Club players
Essendon Football Club players
Melbourne Football Club players
St Kilda Football Club players
Port Melbourne Football Club players
Port Melbourne Football Club coaches
1982 deaths
Australian Army personnel of World War II
Australian Army soldiers
People from Northcote, Victoria
Military personnel from Melbourne